Samson Gbadebo (born 19 October 1996 in Port Harcourt, Nigeria) is a Nigerian professional footballer who plays as a central defender for NPFL club, Akwa United.

References

1996 births
Living people
Footballers from Rivers State
Sportspeople from Port Harcourt
Akwa United F.C. players
Association football central defenders
Nigerian footballers